Altorado is a ghost town in the County of Forty Mile No. 8, Alberta, Canada.

The community was originally settled during the creation of a Canadian Pacific Railway line from Weyburn, Saskatchewan to Stirling, Alberta in an attempt to profit from railway trade. During 1912–1913, pioneers, mainly members of the Church of Jesus Christ of Latter-day Saints, settled at Altorado, located southeast of present-day Foremost. By 1913, the community had a doctor, a post office, two general stores, and three blacksmiths.

However, in 1913, the line bypassed the community in favour of Foremost, and the community became non-viable.

External links

 

County of Forty Mile No. 8
Ghost towns in Alberta
Populated places established in 1912
Latter-day Saint settlements in Canada
1912 establishments in Alberta